Alex White may refer to:

Sports
 Alex White (badminton) in 1985 IBF World Championships – Men's singles
 Alex White (baseball) (born 1988), American professional baseball player
 Alex White (footballer) (1916–1995), Scottish footballer
 Alex White (fighter) (born 1988), American professional mixed martial artist
 Alex White (rower) (born 1983), South African Olympic rower
 Alex White (skateboarder), American skateboarder

Musicians
 Alex White (musician), multi-instrumentalist with Electric Soft Parade
 Miss Alex White, musician

Others
 Alex White (author), American writer of science fiction
 Alex White (politician) (born 1958), politician and barrister in Ireland
 Alex Hyde-White (born 1959), English-born, US-raised film and television actor

See also
 Al White (disambiguation)
 Alexander White (disambiguation)